Veronika Stallmaier, née Wallinger, (born July 30, 1964 in St. Kolomann) is a retired Austrian alpine skier.

External links
 
 
 

1966 births
Living people
Austrian female alpine skiers
Alpine skiers at the 1984 Winter Olympics
Alpine skiers at the 1992 Winter Olympics
Alpine skiers at the 1994 Winter Olympics
Olympic alpine skiers of Austria
Olympic bronze medalists for Austria
Olympic medalists in alpine skiing
Medalists at the 1992 Winter Olympics
20th-century Austrian women
21st-century Austrian women